Nacho Sánchez (born 1992) is a Spanish actor. After earning early recognition in stage works such as La piedra oscura and Ivan and the Dogs, he made his feature film debut in the 2019 film Seventeen. He has since featured in films such The Art of Return and Manticore.

Biography 
Nacho Sánchez was born in Ávila in 1992. He made his baby steps on stage in the IES Isabel de Castilla's theatre group 'Criatura'. He was discovered by Pablo Messiez, who gave Sánchez a role in the play La piedra oscura. Sánchez' performance in the play earned him the Actors and Actresses Union Award for Best New Actor. He has since starred in different plays in the Teatro Español, including the monologue Ivan and the Dogs portraying  Ivan Mishukov. His performance in the former play earned him the Max Award for Best Leading Actor, thereby reportedly becoming the youngest recipient ever in the history of the award category. Also in the Teatro Español, he starred alongside Emma Vilarasau in the staging of El sueño de la vida, an unfinished work by García Lorca.

Sánchez made his feature film debut in Daniel Sánchez Arévalo's film Seventeen. He starred alongside Biel Montoro and portrayed Ismael, the elder brother of Montoro's Héctor, whom with the character embarks on road trip across the Cantabrian coast. His performance clinched him a nomination to the Goya Award for Best New Actor. He then featured alongside Macarena García and Ingrid García-Jonsson in the 2020 film The Art of Return, directed by Pedro Collantes. He also featured in The Sea Beyond. He starred alongside Jorge Perugorría in the Filmin streaming series Doctor Portuondo, released in 2021, portraying the role of Carlo Padial, the creator of the series. Also in 2021, he landed a starring role in Carlos Vermut's Manticore, portraying Julián, a video game designer tortured by a grim secret.

Filmography

Accolades

References 

1992 births
People from Ávila, Spain
Living people
Spanish male stage actors
Spanish male film actors
Spanish male television actors
21st-century Spanish male actors
Male actors from Castile and León